Clive Fiske Harrison (born 23 November 1939) is an English stockbroker. He is the chairman of Fiske plc, an independent stockbroking firm based in London.

Early life

According to Debrett's, Fiske Harrison was educated at Felsted School and Trinity Hall, Cambridge, and worked at Panmure Gordon, as a stockbroker, alongside British Prime Minister David Cameron's father Ian Cameron, before joining Fiske & Co in the early 1970s.

Fiske & Co

In 1975, Fiske & Co merged with stockbrokers Bragg, Stockdale, Hall & Co, founded in 1819, and headed by Michael Brudenell-Bruce, 8th Marquess of Ailesbury. (Lord Ailebsury became a partner at Fiske & Co, and later joined the board when it became a limited company.) Fiske has grown to almost a billion pounds under investment, became a publicly listed company in 2000, Fiske plc, and was named the top British stockbroker by the financial news service Bloomberg the following year.

Its chairman has long taken a sceptical view of the market, leading the City Editor of The Times to comment in January 2009: "One person whose views I respect is Clive Fiske Harrison who runs Fiske & Co, the stockbroker. He has spent no less than 47 years in the stock market. In a letter to clients and friends just before Christmas he warned that the market's reaction to the present problems was still relatively modest in the context of past crises and almost certainly had further to go." Three years later the City Editor of the Evening Standard congratulated him on his half century, pointing out that he had joined Panmure Gordon at the same time as the famously long serving David Mayhew who became chairman of Cazenove & Co, later J.P. Morgan Cazenove, but even he had retired the year before.

Family

According to Burke's, he is a relation of Major Fiske Goodeve Fiske-Harrison of Copford Hall in Copford, Essex, High Sheriff of Essex, and himself resides in the nearby village of Layer de la Haye and also in Eaton Square in Belgravia, London. (He is also a distant cousin of Field Marshall Earl Kitchener and, by marriage, Field Marshal Viscount Gough.) He married and had three sons. His eldest son Byron is a polo player and was a cavalry officer in the British Army, his middle son Jules was, according to The Times, a "famously skilled and fearless skier" who died in a skiing accident in Zermatt, Switzerland in 1988 and his youngest son Alexander is an author and former amateur bullfighter who has also participated in the annual 'running of the bulls' in Pamplona alongside his father.

References

External links
 Fiske Plc Website
 Fiske Harrison Family website

1939 births
Living people
Alumni of Trinity Hall, Cambridge
English investment bankers
English investors
English money managers
English stockbrokers
People educated at Felsted School